I-3K or the INSAT 3000 is a satellite bus developed by Indian Space Research Organisation (ISRO), and marketed by Antrix Corporation and New Space India Ltd. It is the standard bus for 3,000-kg class satellites; the 'I' in I-3K stands for INSAT, a group of communication satellites developed and launched by ISRO. The I-3K bus can supply DC power up to 6500 watts, and is suitable for satellites with lift-off mass in range of 3,000-3,400 kg.

List of satellites launched using I-3K bus
 Eutelsat W2M (Now Afghansat 1)
 INSAT series (4A  4B)
 GSAT series (8  10  16  15  18  19  17  24  29  30)

See also

 Comparison of satellite buses

References

External links
 I-3K ISRO brochure

Indian Space Research Organisation
Satellite buses